K-type main-sequence stars may be candidates for supporting extraterrestrial life. These stars are known as "Goldilocks stars" as they emit enough radiation in the non-UV ray spectrum to provide a temperature that allows liquid water to exist on the surface of a planet; they also remain stable in the main sequence longer than the Sun by burning their hydrogen slower, allowing more time for life to form on a planet around a K-type main-sequence star.  The planet's habitable zone,  ranging from 0.1–0.4 to 0.3–1.3 astronomical units (AU), depending on the size of the star, is often far enough from the star so as not to be tidally locked to the star, and to have a sufficiently low solar flare activity not to be lethal to life. In comparison, red dwarf stars have too much solar activity and quickly tidally lock the planets in their habitable zones, making them less suitable for life. The odds of complex life arising may be better on planets around K-type main-sequence stars than around Sun-like stars, given the suitable temperature and extra time available for it to evolve. Some planets around K-type main-sequence stars are potential candidates for extraterrestrial life.

Habitable zone
A K-type star's habitable zone approximately ranges between 0.1–0.4 to 0.3–1.3 AU from the star. Here, exoplanets will receive only a relatively small amount of ultraviolet radiation, especially so towards the outer edge. This is favorable to support life, as it means that there is enough radiated energy to allow liquid water to exist on the surface, but not so much, especially ionizing radiation, as to destroy life.

The habitable zone is also very stable, lasting for most of the K-type main-sequence star's main sequence phase and with little instability of luminosity during that phase.

Potentially habitable planets around K-type main-sequence stars
The super-Earth HD 40307 g around the K2.5V star HD 40307 orbits in the CHZ, although it has a reasonably elliptical orbit (e=0.22). There may be many more, and the Kepler space telescope (now retired) was one of the main sources of information of these exoplanets. Kepler-62 and Kepler-442 are examples of discoveries by Kepler of systems consisting of a K-type dwarf with potentially habitable planets orbiting it. A super-Earth orbiting a K-type main-sequence star called HD 85512 b was originally thought to have habitability potential, but it is now considered too hot to be potentially habitable.

See also
 Astrobiology
 Circumstellar habitable zone
 Habitability of neutron star systems
 Habitability of red dwarf systems
 Habitability of yellow dwarf systems
 Planetary habitability

References

Habitability
K-type main-sequence star systems
Astrobiology